Noah Pink is a screenwriter, television producer, and director. He created the television series Genius for National Geographic, and wrote the screenplay Tetris for Apple TV+. His low-budget feature novella, Zedcrew, debuted at the 2010 Director's Fortnight at the Cannes Film Festival. He also competed for Canada in swimming at the 2001 Maccabiah Games in Israel.

Early life 
Pink was born in Halifax, Nova Scotia, Canada. He attended Halifax Grammar School. He then attended the University of Pennsylvania, where he was a member of the Men's Swimming Team, and graduated in 2005.

He competed for Canada in swimming at the 2001 Maccabiah Games in Israel.

Filmography

References 

Year of birth missing (living people)
Living people
21st-century Canadian male writers
21st-century Canadian screenwriters
Canadian male screenwriters
Competitors at the 2001 Maccabiah Games
Jewish Canadian sportspeople
Jewish swimmers
Maccabiah Games competitors for Canada
Maccabiah Games swimmers
Penn Quakers men's swimmers
Writers from Halifax, Nova Scotia